The Girl Guides South Africa is a girls-only organisation and is recognised by the World Association of Girl Guides and Girl Scouts (WAGGGS). As of 2003 it has 20,466 members.

Program and ideals
The programme of the Girl Guides South Africa caters for girls from 4½ to 25 years of age. 
 Teddies 4½–7
 Brownies 7–10
 Guides 10–14
 Rangers and Young Leaders 14–25

There are a number of regions within Girl Guides South Africa, namely:

Eastern Cape 
 Butterworth
 Cape East
 Central
EG Kei
 Mgwali
 Mthatha
 Queenstown
Free State - Orania
Gauteng
 Central
 East
 North
 Soweto
 West
KwaZulu Natal 
 Coastal
 Inland
 Midlands
 Northern
 Southern
Limpopo
Mpumalanga
 East
  West
North West 
 Mafikeng
 Rustenburg
 Vryburg
Northern Cape Kuruman
Cape West

Guide Promise 
I promise to do my best,

To do my duty,

To my god and to my country,

To help other people and to keep the Guide Law

Guide Motto 
Be Prepared

33rd World Conference

The Girl Guides South Africa hosted WAGGGS' 33rd World Conference from 6 to 12 July 2008 in Johannesburg. It was held in the Birchwood Executive Hotel and Conference Centre.

See also
 Scouts South Africa

World Association of Girl Guides and Girl Scouts member organizations
Scouting and Guiding in South Africa

Youth organizations established in 1910
1910 establishments in South Africa